Humberto Daniel Arencibia Martinez (born November 20, 1989 in Pinar del Río) is an amateur Cuban freestyle wrestler, who competes in the men's light heavyweight category. He won a silver medal for his division at the 2011 Pan American Games in Guadalajara, Mexico.

Arencibia represented Cuba at the 2012 Summer Olympics in London, where he competed in the men's 84 kg class. He received a bye for the preliminary round of sixteen match, before losing out to U.S. wrestler and Pan American Games champion Jake Herbert, with a three-set technical score (4–1, 0–8, 1–1), and a classification point score of 1–3.

References

External links
Profile – International Wrestling Database
NBC Olympics Profile

1989 births
Living people
Olympic wrestlers of Cuba
Wrestlers at the 2012 Summer Olympics
Wrestlers at the 2011 Pan American Games
Pan American Games silver medalists for Cuba
People from Pinar del Río
Cuban male sport wrestlers
Pan American Games medalists in wrestling
Medalists at the 2011 Pan American Games
20th-century Cuban people
21st-century Cuban people